is a Japanese given name used by either gender.

Possible writings
Jun can be written using different kanji characters and can mean:
純, "genuine/pure"
潤, "moisture"
淳, "pure/genuine"
順, "obey"
準, "conform to/consult with"
洵, "truth"
隼, "falcon"
The name can also be written in hiragana or katakana.

People with the name
Jun (musician), Japanese musician
Jun Akiyama (準, born 1969), Japanese wrestler
, Japanese footballer
Jun Aoyama (隼, born 1988), Japanese football player
Jun Ashida (淳, 1930–2018), Japanese fashion designer
Jun Azumi (淳, born 1962), Japanese politician
 , Japanese women's footballer
Jun Etō (淳, 1933–1999), Japanese literary critic
Jun Falkenstein (淳, 1969), Japanese-American animation director
Jun Fan (振, 1940–1973), martial artist, actor, philosopher
Jun Fubuki (ジュン, born 1952), Japanese actress
Jun Fukuda (純, 1923–2000), Japanese director
Jun Fukuyama (潤, born 1978), Japanese voice actor and singer
, Japanese manga artist
Jun Hayashi (潤, born 1972), Japanese politician
Jun Ichikawa (準, 1948–2008), Japanese film director and screenwriter
, Japanese television personality, singer, actor and comedian
Jun Ishikawa (author) (淳, 1899–1987), Japanese author, translator and literary critic
Jun Itoda (潤, born 1972), Japanese comedian
Jun Izumida (純, born 1965), Japanese wrestler
Jun Kaname (潤, born 1981), Japanese actor
Jun Kaneko (born 1942), Japanese ceramic artist
Jun Kasai (純, born 1974), Japanese wrestler
, Japanese tennis player
Jun Kawada (順, 1882–1962), Japanese tanka poet and entrepreneur
, Japanese footballer
Jun Kondo (淳, born 1930), Japanese theoretical physicist
Jun Konno (潤, born 1967), Japanese judoka
Jun Maki (準, 1948–2009), Japanese copywriter
Jun Masuo (遵, born 1986), Japanese actor
Jun Matsumoto (潤, born 1983), member of the J-pop group Arashi
Jun Miki (淳, 1919–1992), Japanese photographer
, Japanese entomologist
Jun Miyake (純, born 1958), Japanese composer
, Japanese footballer
Jun Mizusawa (潤, born 1989), Japanese voice actress
Jun Morinaga (純, born 1937), Japanese photographer
Jun Mochizuki (淳), Japanese mangaka
Jun Murai (純, born 1955), Japanese computer scientist
Jun Murakami (淳, born 1973), Japanese actor
Jun Nagai (純, born 1944), Japanese middle-distance runner
Jun Nagao (淳, born 1964), Japanese composer
Jun Nagura (潤, born 1968), Japanese comedian and actor
Jun Natsukawa (純, born 1980), Japanese gravure idol
, Japanese communist and hijacker
, Japanese footballer
Jun Onose (潤), better known as J, Japanese musician
Jun Osakada (淳, born 1974), Japanese sprinter
Jun John Sakurai (純), Japanese American particle physicist and theorist
Jun Sawada (born 1955), Japanese businessman, CEO of Nippon Telegraph and Telephone 
Jun Seba (淳, 1974-2010), Japanese hip hop producer
Jun Sena (じゅん, born 1974), Japanese musical actress of Takarazuka Revue
Jun Senoue (純, born 1970), Japanese video game composer and musician
Jun Shibata (淳, born 1976), Japanese pop singer-songwriter
Jun Shibuki (淳, born 1968), Japanese musical actress and performer
Jun Shikano (潤), a Japanese voice actress
, Japanese footballer
Jun Shiraoka (順, born 1944), Japanese photographer
Jun Suemi (純, born 1959), Japanese illustrator
Jun Tanaka (poet) (純, 1890–1966), Japanese poet
Jun Tanaka (chef), British Japanese chef
Jun Takami (順, 1907–1965), Japanese novelist and poet
Jun Takeuchi (潤), Japanese video game director and producer
Jun Togawa (純, born 1961), Japanese singer, musician and actress
Jun Ushiroku (淳, 1884–1973), general in the Imperial Japanese Army
Jun Yamaguchi (淳, born 1967), Japanese composer
, Japanese sprinter
Jun Yamazaki (born 1956), Japanese diplomat
Wakanami Jun (順, 1941–2007), Japanese sumo wrestler

Fictional characters
Jun Aoi (ジュン), a character in Martian Successor Nadesico series
Jun Hono (ジュン), a character in the works of manga artist Go Nagai
Jun Isashiki (純), a character in Ace of Diamond
Jun Kazama (準), a character in the Tekken fighting games
Jun Kazari (飾利 潤), a character in the Magia Record mobile game for the Puella Magi Madoka Magica anime franchise
Jun Sakurada (ジュン), the protagonist of the anime series Rozen Maiden
Jun Sazanami (ジュン), a character from the Japanese idol franchise Ensemble Stars!
Jun Shiomi (汐見 潤), a character from the Food Wars!: Shokugeki no Soma manga and anime series
Jun Suzuki (鈴木 純), a character in the K-On! manga and anime series
Jun Kurosu (淳), a character in Persona 2
Jun Motomiya (ジュン), a character in Digimon Adventure 02
Jun Yabuki (ジュン) or Yellow Four II, a character in the Super Sentai series Choudenshi Bioman
Jun Yamamoto (純), a character in Special A
Jun Yamano (純), a character in the Yoroiden-Samurai Troopers series 
Jun (ジュン), a character in the anime Pokémon appearing in DP episode 101
Jun Manjoume (準), a character in Yu-Gi-Oh! GX
Jun-A266, A Spartan soldier in Halo: Reach
Jun Ushiro (宇白 順), a character in Bokurano: Ours
Jun Naruse (成瀬 順), a character in The Anthem of the Heart
 Tao Jun, a character in Shaman King
Jun Sato, a character in  Star Wars Rebels
Jun Kiyama, a character in  Denshi Sentai Denziman
Jun Guevaru/Che Guevara, a character in Baki: son of the ogre
Jun Shirogane, a character in Princess Connect! Re:Dive

See also
Iron Virgin Jun, a Japanese manga and OVA series created by Go Nagai
Jun (disambiguation)
Jeon (Korean name)

Japanese unisex given names